Feudal Alloy is a 2019 platform role-playing video game by Czech studio Attu Games.

Story
Attu is a robot whose village was raided by bandits. He decides to take an action and sets out after the bandits to get the stolen goods back.

Gameplay
Feudal Alloy belongs to the Metroidvania genre. Players control a robot in mechanised medieval armor. Players search tunnels full of enemies, seeking paths to new areas and components to upgrade the robot's gear.  As the game progresses, players meet stronger enemies but also gains access to better equipment. Players also must check the robot's oil, upgrade and temperature bars. If the robot's temperature is too high, players must wait until it cools down. The oil bar represents players' health and the upgrade bar represents their experience.

Reception
Feudal Alloy has received generally positive reviews from critics. It holds 76% on Metacritic. The game was also nominated for Czech Game of the Year Award in category Audiovisual Execution.

References

External links
 

2019 video games
Side-scrolling platform games
Metroidvania games
Role-playing video games
Indie video games
Single-player video games
Video games developed in the Czech Republic
Steampunk video games
PlayStation 4 games
Windows games
MacOS games
Xbox One games
Android (operating system) games
Nintendo Switch games
Linux games
Video games about robots
Video games set in the Middle Ages